Demirev is a Bulgarian masculine surname, its feminine counterpart is Demireva. It may refer to
Demir Demirev (born 1984), Bulgarian weightlifter
Ina Demireva (born 1989), Bulgarian ice dancer
Mirela Demireva (born 1989), Bulgarian high jumper
Stoyan Georgiev Demirev (born 1932), Bulgarian cyclist

Bulgarian-language surnames